Punjdhera is a village and union council of Chakwal is a district of Punjab, Pakistan.

References

Union councils of Chakwal District
Populated places in Chakwal District